Chang Jung-lin (born May 2, 1985) is a Taiwanese 8-ball and Nine-ball pool player. 

He became WPA World Eight-ball Champion in 2012 and won the silver medal at the 2013 World Games for Nine-ball. Jun-Lin is a former world number 1, having done so first after winning WPA World Eight-ball Championship in 2012.

He studied at Chinese Culture University and is currently married.

Career
At the 2012 WPA World Eight-ball Championship, Jung-lin defeated compatriot Fu Che-wei in the final 11–6, after previously winning his semi-final 9–7 against Chris Melling.

In 2013, Chang would compete in the 2013 World Games, reaching the final of the Men's Nine-Ball championships, where he would become runner-up to England's Darren Appleton, with the score ending 10–11.

He began playing with Predator in 2017.

Career titles and achievements
 2020 Diamond Las Vegas Open
 2020 CPBA Champion of Champions
 2019 Derby City Classic Bigfoot 10-Ball Challenge
 2019 Mid-West Billiards & Cue Expo 10-Ball
 2018 International Open 9-Ball Championship  
 2017 Asian Indoor and Martial Arts Games 9-Ball Singles
 2017 CBSA Liuzhou 9-Ball Open 
 2017 Japan Open 10-Ball
 2013 Golden Break 9-ball Open
 2012 WPA World Eight-ball Championship
 2012 All Japan Championship 10-Ball
 2012 WPA World Team Championship
 2011 Beijing 9-Ball Open
 2011 Japan Open 10-Ball
 2008 Guinness Asian 9-Ball Tour (Malaysia)
 2008 Guinness Asian 9-Ball Tour (Republic of China Leg)
 2008 Guinness Asian 9-Ball Tour (Malaysia)
 2007 Guinness Asian 9-Ball Tour (Indonesia Leg) 
 2007 Guinness Asian 9-Ball Tour (Malaysia Leg) 
 2007 Guinness Asian 9-Ball Tour (Indonesia Leg)

References

External links
 Chang Jung-Lin at AZBilliards

Taiwanese pool players
1985 births
Living people
World champions in pool
World Games silver medalists
Competitors at the 2013 World Games
WPA World Eight-ball Champions
Cue sports players at the 2010 Asian Games
Asian Games competitors for Chinese Taipei